San Juan del Río  is one of the 39 municipalities of Durango, in north-western Mexico. The municipal seat is at San Juan del Rio. The municipality covers an area of 1279 km².

In 2010, the municipality had a population of 11,855, up from 10,364 in 2005. 

The municipality has 109 localities, the largest of which (with 2010 populations in parentheses) were San Juan del Río del Centauro del Norte (2,912), classified as urban, and Diez de Octubre (San Lucas de Ocampo) (1,500), classified as rural.

References

Municipalities of Durango